The Paipa–Iza volcanic complex is a volcanic field of Late Pliocene to Early Pleistocene age on the Altiplano Cundiboyacense in the Eastern Ranges of the Colombian Andes. It is the northernmost volcanic complex of the Andean Volcanic Belt with Fueguino in Tierra del Fuego, Chile, at the opposite end of the Andean mountain belt.

The complex, comprising mainly felsic extrusive volcanic rocks as rhyolites, also is the only confirmed volcanic province in the Eastern Ranges, with traces of probably contemporaneous explosive volcanic activity in the vicinity of Guatavita, Cundinamarca.

The Paipa-Iza volcanic field is important as a touristic site with thermal baths in both Paipa and Iza and is being studied for the potential of geothermal energy production and for the extraction of uranium in the area.

Etymology 
The names Paipa and Iza originate in Muysccubun, the language of the indigenous Muisca, who inhabited the Altiplano Cundiboyacense before the Spanish conquest. Paipa was the name of a cacique who served under cacique Tundama of Duitama and Iza means "place of healing".

Geography 

The northwestern part of the complex is situated in the municipality Paipa and the southeastern part in Iza, both belonging to the department of Boyacá.

Climate

Paipa–Iza volcanic complex 

The complex was active from the late Pliocene, around 2.7 Ma, until the earliest Pleistocene, around 2.3 Ma.

They consist of porphyritic rhyolites with sanidine and plagioclase as dominant mineral groups and abundant xenoliths of sedimentary rock and in minor quantities volcanic or metamorphic fragments. The overall rock composition is very felsic and comprises biotites and amphiboles as opaque minerals.

Geothermal energy 
The complex is studied for the potential of geothermal energy production.

Resources 
The complex is studied for the potential of uranium mining.

Regional geology

Cretaceous

See also 
 List of volcanoes in Colombia
 Altiplano Cundiboyacense
 Bogotá savanna

References

Bibliography

Geology

Geothermal

Resources

Maps

External links 
 Volcanoes in the Eastern Ranges - Masmuisca.com

Volcanic fields
Volcanoes of Colombia
Andean Volcanic Belt
Pliocene volcanoes
Pliocene South America
Neogene Colombia
Pleistocene volcanoes
Pleistocene Colombia
Altiplano Cundiboyacense
Geography of Boyacá Department
Muysccubun